JACK Audio Connection Kit (or JACK; a recursive acronym) is a professional sound server API and pair of daemon implementations to provide real-time, low-latency connections for both audio and MIDI data between applications. JACK was developed by a community of open-source developers led by Paul Davis (who won an Open Source Award in 2004 for this work) and has been a key piece of infrastructure and the de facto standard for professional audio software on Linux since its inception in 2002. The server is free software, licensed under GPL-2.0-or-later, while the library is licensed under LGPL-2.1-or-later.

Implementations 
The JACK API is standardized by consensus, and two compatible implementations exist: jack1, which is implemented in plain C and has been in maintenance mode for a while, and jack2 (originally jackdmp), a re-implementation in C++ originally led by Stéphane Letz, which introduced multi-processor scalability and support for operating systems other than Linux.

JACK can be used with ALSA, PortAudio, CoreAudio, FFADO and OSS as hardware back-ends. Additionally, a dummy driver (useful if no sound output is desired, e.g. for offline rendering) and an Audio-over-UDP driver exist.  One or both implementations can run on Linux, macOS, Solaris, Windows, iOS, FreeBSD, OpenBSD and NetBSD.

The JACK API is also implemented by PipeWire, which is able to act as a complete drop-in replacement provider for JACK clients, mapping JACK API calls to equivalent PipeWire calls. If used as a replacement for ALSA and PulseAudio as well, it can unify the different sound servers and APIs that might be typically found on a machine, and allow better integration between different software. PipeWire also claims to add a number of features and fix a number of limitations compared to JACK. The use of PipeWire as the default implementation of JACK is the default on Fedora 34 and newer.

Low-latency scheduling 

The scheduling requirements of JACK to achieve sufficiently low latencies were one of the driving forces behind the real-time optimization effort for the Linux kernel 2.6 series, whose initial latency performance had been disappointing compared to the older 2.4 series. Real-time tuning work culminated in numerous scheduling improvements to the mainline kernel and the creation of an -rt branch for more intrusive optimizations in the release 2.6.24, and later the CONFIG_PREEMPT_RT patch.

Applications with JACK support

See also 

 LADSPA & LV2 – APIs for plugins
 PulseAudio – sound server for desktop use
 List of Linux audio software
 Comparison of free software for audio
 ASIO free alternatives

References

External links 
 
 JACK API Documentation
 Linux Journal article
 
 List of JACK enabled applications
 Another article on JACK (PDF, non-free)
 JACK on iOS (iPhone and iPad)

Application programming interfaces
Audio libraries
Audio software for Linux
Free audio software
Linux APIs
Music software plugin architectures